The Kar-Kiya dynasty, also known as the Kiya'ids, was a local dynasty which mainly ruled over Biya-pish (eastern Gilan) from the 1370s to 1592. They claimed Sasanian ancestry as well. Lahijan was the dynasty's capital.

The Kar-Kiya dynasty helped Shah Ismail I to establish the Safavid Empire and later became a vassal state of the empire. The Safavid shah, Abbas I put an end to the Kiya'id dynasty by dispatching an army to Gilan in 1592.

Kar-Kiya rulers
 Ali Kiya (1370s–1389)
 Hady Kiya (1389–1394)
 Amir Sayyed Mohammad (1394–1430)
 Sayyed Naser Kiya (1430–1448)
 Soltan-Mohammad Kiya (1448–1478)
 Soltan-Ali Mirza (1478–1504/05)
 Soltan-Hasan (1504/05–1506)
 Soltan-Ahmad Khan (1506–1534)
 Soltan-Kiya Ali (1534–1534/5)
 Soltan-Hasan Kiya (1534/5–1538)
 Khan Ahmad Khan (1538–1592)

References

Sources
 
 
 
 
 
 
 
 
 
 

Shia dynasties
Iranian Muslim dynasties
15th century in Iran
16th century in Iran
History of Gilan
History of Talysh
Zaydis